Drut is the concluding section of a vocal raga performance in Hindustani music. Drut may also refer to
Guy Drut (born 1950), French hurdler and politician 
Drut (river), a river in Belarus, a right tributary of Dnieper